Paulinus II was a claimant to the See of Antioch from 362 to 388. He was supported by members of the Eustathian party, and was a rival to Meletius of Antioch. The Eustathians objected to Meletius having been consecrated by Arians, and had begun to meet separately. Lucifer of Calaris ordained Paulinus as bishop, thus effecting a schism in the church.

Paulinus was "highly esteemed for piety." He was acknowledged as bishop by Jerome, whom he ordained as priest, and by Epiphanius of Salamis.

Paulinus died in 388. His followers were called "Paulinians."

References

388 deaths
4th-century births
Patriarchs of Antioch
Opponents of Arianism
4th-century archbishops
4th-century Syrian bishops
People of Roman Syria